The Rugby League Super 8s were a feature of the British rugby league system, between 2015 and 2018, and were played in the top three professional divisions. Following the completion of the regular season home-and-away fixtures in the Super League, the Championship and League 1, teams split into smaller divisions of 8 based on their finishing positions on the league table; the teams then played an additional fixture against each of the seven other teams in their division to determine the final standings.

Regular season

Super League
The Super League season sees teams play each other home and away, and one team for a third time at the Magic Weekend. After 23 games, the league table is frozen and the teams are split up into "Super 8s". Teams finishing in the top 8 will play 7 more games each as they compete in the Super League Super 8 group for a place in the Grand Final. Teams finishing in the bottom four will join the top 4 teams from the Championship in The Qualifiers Super 8 group and also play 7 more games each for a place in the next years Super League competition.

Championship
The Championship season sees teams play each other home and away, and one team for a third time at The Summer Bash. After 23 games, the league table is frozen and the teams are split up into "Super 8s". Teams finishing in the top 4 will play 7 more games each as they compete in the Qualifiers to try and earn a place in next seasons Super League. Teams finishing in the bottom 8 compete in the Championship Shield Super 8 group and also play 7 more games each.

Super League Super 8s

After 23 games the league table is frozen and the teams are split up into 2 of the 3 "Super 8s". Teams finishing in the top 8 go on to play 7 more games each, to compete for a place in the play-offs, and all retain a place in Super League for the next season. Teams finishing in the bottom four (9-12) will compete alongside the top 4 teams from the Championship, in "The Qualifiers" Super 8 group. These teams will reset their season standings and also play 7 extra games each, as they attempt to earn a place in the following year's Super League competition.

Super League

Play-Offs

1st vs 4th
2nd vs 3rd

Grand final

The Qualifiers

The Qualifiers Super 8s sees the bottom 4 teams from Super League table join the top 4 teams from the Championship. The points totals are reset to 0 and each team plays 7 games each, playing every other team once. After 7 games each the teams finishing 1st, 2nd, and 3rd will gain qualification to the next years Super League season. The teams finishing 4th and 5th will play in the "Million Pound Game" at the home of the 4th place team which will earn the winner a place in the next years Super League; the loser, along with teams finishing 6th, 7th and 8th, will be relegated to the Championship.

Million Pound Game

The Million Pound Game is a promotion play-off in the Qualifiers between the teams finishing 4th and 5th. The game is played at the ground of the team finishing 4th and the winner earns a place in the next season's Super League while the loser plays the next season in the Championship.

Championship Shield

The third of the three "Super 8" groups sees teams finishing 5th to 12th in the regular Championship table. Like the Super League 8s, these teams retain their original points and play 7 extra games, with the teams finishing in the top 4 places after these extra games contesting play-offs similar to Super League, with 1st v 4th and 2nd vs 3rd, with the winners contesting the Championship Shield Grand Final.

The two teams finishing at the bottom of this Super 8s group (7th and 8th) will be relegated to League One and be replaced by two promoted sides.

See also

Super League
Championship (rugby league)
League 1 (rugby league)

References

External links

Super League
Championship (rugby league)
RFL League 1